"There Is No Line" is the pilot episode of the American comedy-drama television series Hacks. It was directed by Lucia Aniello and co-written with Paul W. Downs, and Jen Statsky. The episode establishes the plot of the series, which centers comediennes from different generations (played by Jean Smart and Hannah Einbinder) who are thrust into a working relationship after separate circumstances threaten their careers. The episode premiered on streaming network HBO Max on May 13, 2021 with an approximate running time of 29 minutes.

"There Is No Line" received Primetime Emmy Awards for Outstanding Writing for a Comedy Series and Outstanding Directing for a Comedy Series.

Plot 
Deborah Vance is an established comedienne in the twilight of her career with a residency at The Palmetto casino in Las Vegas, Nevada. She is financially successful and content with her regular Friday and Saturday night performances, as well as her frequent QVC sales appearances. She later panics when Marty, the Palmetto's owner, takes her to lunch to celebrate her 2,500th performance and informs her that he is moving her to midweek so that her premium dates can be given to new acts like Pentatonix. Later she finds out that her ex-husband has died via television news but she is unmoved by the news. The newscaster reads copy stating that Deborah burned down his house decades ago after he left her for her sister. When her workaholic COO Marcus asks if she'd like to take the night off, she declines.

Ava Daniels is a confident yet arrogant 25-year-old television writer working in Los Angeles. She's reeling from significant backlash after Tweeting a joke about a conservative congressman's gay son. She's been fired from her job and her manager, Jimmy, informs her that her only option is to go work for Deborah Vance, another client of his.

With no other choice, Ava flies to Vegas to meet Deborah, who does not want to work with a writer because she has always written her own material. After Deborah dresses Ava down for not having prepared for the meeting, they trade insults and Ava leaves. However, Deborah chases after her and begins to workshop the joke that upended Ava's career. They tweak the joke until they are both satisfied and Deborah tells Ava she's hired.

Cast

Starring 
 Jean Smart as Deborah Vance
 Hannah Einbinder as Ava Daniels
 Carl Clemons-Hopkins as Marcus

Guest stars 
 Paul W. Downs as Jimmy
 Kaitlin Olson as DJ
 Christopher McDonald as Marty
 Megan Stalter as Kayla
 Rose Abdoo as Josefina
 Mark Indelicato as Damien
 Ally Maki as Taylor

Production 
"There Is No Line" was written by show creators Lucia Aniello, Paul W. Downs, and Jen Statsky, and directed by Aniello. The creators conceived of the idea for Hacks during a road trip to Portland in 2016. In an interview for Collider, Aniello said that the show aims to highlight the work of women trailblazers in comedy whose contributions have been minimized or who have experienced mistreatment by the media. It was shot in Los Angeles with some exterior shots on-location in Las Vegas.

The episode was released on HBO Max on May 13, 2021.

Critical reception 
The episode received positive reception. Jean Smart and Hannah Einbinder were each hailed for their acting. Glen Weldon wrote for NPR of Smart's performance, "I don't know if the role of Deborah Vance was written for Smart, but she certainly makes it seem like it was. Moments that could be played for unkind laughs...are instead played for their humanity and vulnerability. As a result, the payoffs prove infinitely more satisfying." Einbinder also received praise from Kristen Baldwin of EW: "Einbinder, an L.A.-based stand-up comic tackling her first leading role, is immensely appealing as Ava. With her precision timing and bored California drawl, the actress brings such compelling confidence to her entitled, condescending character that it's all the more effective when Ava finally begins to face some hard truths about herself."

Awards and nominations

References

External links 

"There Is No Line"—Full pilot script on Deadline Hollywood

2021 American television episodes
American television series premieres
Emmy Award-winning episodes
Hacks (TV series)